E. J. Whitley (born February 16, 1982) is a former American football guard in the National Football League for the Dallas Cowboys. He played college football at Texas Tech University.

Early years
Whitley attended Texas City (TX), where he was a two-way tackle. As a junior, he was a part of the state's top ranked defense, helping the team achieve a 14-0 record and win the 1999 state championship.

He was a two-time all-district player and an all-state selection as a senior. He also practiced basketball.

College career
Whitley accepted a football scholarship from Texas Tech University. As a redshirt freshman, he was a backup at multiple positions on the offensive line, until starting the final 2 games at right tackle, including the 2002 Tangerine Bowl, where he helped the offense score 55 points (school record in a bowl game).

As a sophomore, he was a full-time starter and part of the nation's top passing offense. He helped reduced the number of sacks from 46 in 2002 to 23. As a junior, he started 12 games, helping quarterback Sonny Cumbie lead the nation in passing and total offense.

As a senior, he played at least one game at every offensive line position. He started mainly at both guard positions and at center, as part of an offense that led the nation in passing for the fourth straight year. He finished his college career with 45 total starts, 20 starts at right tackle, 15 at left guard, 5 at right guard, 4 at left tackle and one at center.

Professional career

Dallas Cowboys
Whitley was selected by the Dallas Cowboys in the seventh round (224th overall) of the 2006 NFL Draft, with the intention of playing him at  guard. On May 7, he suffered a torn ACL in his left knee during rookie minicamp and was placed on the injured reserve list. He was waived on March 1, 2007.

Saskatchewan Roughriders
After not playing during the 2007 NFL season, he was invited to the 2008 rookie camp with the Saskatchewan Roughriders but did not make the team.

References

External links
E. J. Whitley bio
Cowboys rookie Whitley tears ACL, will miss season

1982 births
Living people
People from Texas City, Texas
Players of American football from Texas
American football offensive guards
Texas Tech Red Raiders football players
Dallas Cowboys players